Carl Burton Stokes (June 21, 1927 – April 3, 1996) was an American politician and diplomat of the Democratic Party who served as the 51st mayor of Cleveland, Ohio. Elected on November 7, 1967, and taking office on January 1, 1968, he was one of the first black elected mayors of a major U.S. city.

Early life
Stokes was born in Cleveland's Central neighborhood, the son of Louise (Stone) and Charles Stokes, a laundryman who died when Carl was two or three years old. He and his brother, politician Louis Stokes, were raised by their mother at the CMHA's Outhwaite Homes. Stokes was a strong student, but in 1944, he dropped out of high school and took up work at Thompson Products (later TRW). At 18, he joined the U.S. Army and returned to Cleveland after his discharge in 1946. After earning his diploma at East Technical High School the following year, Stokes, who was inspired by civil rights activist Paul Robeson, decided to pursue a career in public service. After attending several colleges, he earned his bachelor's degree in 1954 from the University of Minnesota. In 1956, he graduated from the Cleveland State University College of Law and in 1957, was admitted to the Ohio State Bar Association. While studying law, he served as a probation officer. He served as assistant prosecutor for four years, eventually becoming a partner in the law firm of Stokes, Stokes, continuing that practice into his political career; it was successful after one year.

Career
Stokes served in the Ohio House of Representatives. He narrowly lost a bid for mayor of Cleveland in 1965. His victory two years later drew national attention, as he was the first black mayor of one of the ten biggest cities in the United States.

A charismatic political figure, Stokes had the ability to mobilize both black and white voters. With a 50.5% margin, he defeated Seth Taft, the grandson of former President William Howard Taft in 1967. At the time of his election, Cleveland was a majority white city with a 37% black population. A crucial part of his support came from local businessmen.  After his election, Stokes said, "I can find no more fitting way to end this appeal, by saying to all of you, in a more serious and in the most meaningful way that I can, that truly never before have I ever known to the extent that I know tonight, the full meaning of the words, 'God Bless America', thanks a lot."

As mayor, Stokes "opened city hall jobs to blacks and women." He was known as a strong administrator and reformer, and is remembered for his vision and motivation. Stokes feuded with City Council and the Police Department for much of his tenure. He also initiated Cleveland: Now!, a public and private funding program aimed at the revitalization of Cleveland neighborhoods. Despite fallout over the Glenville shootout, Stokes pulled through and was reelected in 1969. As mayor, he also played a pivotal role in the effort to restore Cleveland's Cuyahoga River in the aftermath of the river fire of June 1969 that brought national attention to the issue of industrial pollution in Cleveland.

Stokes received the "NNPA Award," highest honor of the National Newspaper Publishers Association in 1971.

After his mayoral administration, Stokes gave lectures to colleges around the country. In 1972, he became the first black anchorman in New York City after securing a job with WNBC-TV. While at WNBC New York, Stokes won a New York State Regional Emmy for excellence in craft, for a piece about the opening of the Paul Robeson play, starring James Earl Jones on Broadway. In 1979, he briefly visited Cleveland to endorse Mayor Dennis Kucinich in the 1979 Cleveland mayoral election, warning that "if Voinovich wins, the Democrats might as well forget about the state of Ohio in 1980." After accusing NBC of failing to promote him to a national brief, he returned to Cleveland in 1980 and took up a stint with United Auto Workers, serving as general legal counsel.

Stokes became a municipal judge in Cleveland in 1983. Subsequently, President Bill Clinton appointed him U.S. Ambassador to the Republic of Seychelles in 1994. Stokes received several civic awards, 12 honorary degrees, and served as a U.S. representative "on numerous goodwill trips abroad by request of the White House." He was elected the first black president of the National League of Cities in 1970.

Stokes was diagnosed with cancer of the esophagus while serving as Ambassador to the Seychelles and placed on medical leave. He returned to Cleveland and died at the Cleveland Clinic. His funeral was held at Cleveland Music Hall, presided over by the Rev. Otis Moss. The funeral was carried on WERE radio. Stokes was buried at Lake View Cemetery in Cleveland.

Legacy
The US Federal Courthouse Tower in downtown Cleveland, completed in 2002, was named the Carl B. Stokes Federal Court House Building. There are many other buildings, monuments and a street named for his memory within the City of Cleveland including the CMHA Carl Stokes Center, Stokes Boulevard, and the eponymous Carl Stokes Brigade club. Members of the Brigade celebrate his birthday every year at Lakeview Cemetery with gravesite services.

In November 2006, the Western Reserve Historical Society opened an exhibit entitled Carl and Louis Stokes: from Projects to Politics. Focusing on the brothers' early life at the Outhwaite projects, service in World War II, and eventual rise to politics, the exhibit ran until September 2008.

Perhaps Stokes' greatest legacy was his work to save and preserve Cleveland's Cuyahoga River. Of his efforts, the National Park Service wrote:

Notes

References

Further reading

External links

 The Western Reserve Historical Society's website about the lives of Carl and Louis Stokes
 Carl Stokes's FBI files hosted at the Internet Archive
Stokes: An American Dream on PBS's World channel

Harambee City: Archival site incorporating documents, maps, audio/visual materials related to CORE's work in black power and black economic development.

African-American mayors in Ohio
Mayors of Cleveland
1927 births
1996 deaths
African-American diplomats
African-American judges
African-American lawyers
African-American state legislators in Ohio
Democratic Party members of the Ohio House of Representatives
American prosecutors
Ambassadors of the United States to Seychelles
Clinton administration personnel
Ohio lawyers
Ohio state court judges
United States Army soldiers
Cleveland–Marshall College of Law alumni
University of Minnesota alumni
Deaths from cancer in Ohio
Deaths from esophageal cancer
Burials at Lake View Cemetery, Cleveland
Television anchors from New York City
Politicians from Cleveland
20th-century African-American people
20th-century American lawyers
20th-century American politicians
20th-century American diplomats
United States Army personnel of World War II